Willem de Kooning (April 24, 1904 – March 19, 1997) was a Dutch-American abstract expressionist artist. He was born in Rotterdam and moved to the United States in 1926, becoming an American citizen in 1962. In 1943, he married painter Elaine Fried.

In the years after World War II, de Kooning painted in a style that came to be referred to as abstract expressionism or "action painting", and was part of a group of artists that came to be known as the New York School. Other painters in this group included Jackson Pollock, Elaine de Kooning, Lee Krasner, Franz Kline, Arshile Gorky, Mark Rothko, Hans Hofmann, Nell Blaine, Adolph Gottlieb, Anne Ryan, Robert Motherwell, Philip Guston, Clyfford Still, and Richard Pousette-Dart. De Kooning's retrospective held at MoMA in 2011–2012 made him one of the best-known artists of the 20th century.

Biography

Willem de Kooning was born in Rotterdam, the Netherlands, on April 24, 1904. His parents, Leendert de Kooning and Cornelia Nobel, were divorced in 1907, and de Kooning lived first with his father and then with his mother. He left school in 1916 and became an apprentice in a firm of commercial artists.
In 1926 de Kooning traveled to the United States as a stowaway on the Shelley, a British freighter bound for Argentina, and on August 15 landed at Newport News, Virginia. He stayed at the Dutch Seamen's Home in Hoboken, New Jersey, and found work as a house painter. In 1927 he moved to Manhattan, where he had a studio on West Forty-fourth Street. He supported himself with jobs in carpentry, house painting and commercial art.

De Kooning began painting in his free time, and in 1928 he joined the art colony at Woodstock, New York. He also began to meet some of the modernist artists active in Manhattan. Among them were the American Stuart Davis, the Armenian Arshile Gorky and the Russian John Graham, whom de Kooning collectively called the "Three Musketeers". Gorky, whom de Kooning first met at the home of Misha Reznikoff, became a close friend and, for at least ten years, an important influence. Balcomb Greene said that "de Kooning virtually worshipped Gorky"; according to Aristodimos Kaldis, "Gorky was de Kooning's master". De Kooning's drawing Self-portrait with Imaginary Brother, from about 1938, may show him with Gorky; the pose of the figures is that of a photograph of Gorky with Peter Busa in about 1936.

De Kooning joined the Artists Union in 1934, and in 1935 was employed in the Federal Art Project of the Works Progress Administration, for which he designed a number of murals including some for the Williamsburg Federal Housing Project in Brooklyn. None of them were executed, but a sketch for one was included in New Horizons in American Art at the Museum of Modern Art, his first group show. Starting in 1937, when De Kooning had to leave the Federal Art Project because he did not have American citizenship, he began to work full-time as an artist, earning income from commissions and by giving lessons.  That year de Kooning was assigned to a portion of the mural Medicine for the Hall of Pharmacy at the 1939 World's Fair in New York, which drew the attention of critics, the images themselves so completely new and distinct from the era of American realism.

De Kooning met his wife, Elaine Fried, at the American Artists School in New York. She was 14 years his junior. Thus was to begin a lifelong partnership affected by alcoholism, lack of money, love affairs, quarrels and separations. They were married on December 9, 1943. De Kooning worked on his first series of portrait paintings: standing or sedentary men like Two Men Standing, Man, and Seated Figure (Classic Male), even combining with self-portraits as with Portrait with Imaginary Brother (1938–39).  At this time, de Kooning's work borrowed strongly from Gorky's surrealist imagery and was influenced by Picasso. This changed only when de Kooning met the younger painter Franz Kline, who was also working with the figurative style of American realism and had been drawn to monochrome. Kline, who died young, was one of de Kooning's closest artist friends. Kline's influence is evident in de Kooning's calligraphic black images of this period.

During the late forties and early fifties, de Kooning joined other fellow contemporary artists including Jackson Pollock and Franz Kline, in their struggle to break free from common artistic movements of the era including Cubism, Surrealism and Regionalism. Their emotive gestures and abstract pieces were a result of their attempt to abandon the other movements. This movement was later called 'Abstract  Expressionism' sometimes known as 'Action Painting' and the 'New York School'.

Between 1948 and 1953, De Kooning became more well known for his artistic techniques but he tried not to repeat himself.

In the late 1950s, de Kooning's work shifted away from the figurative work of the women (though he would return to that subject matter on occasion) and began to display an interest in more abstract, less representational imagery. He became a US citizen on March 13, 1962, and in the following year moved from Broadway to a small house in East Hampton, a house which Elaine's brother Peter Fried had sold to him two years before. He built a studio near by, and lived in the house to the end of his life.

It was revealed that, toward the end of his life, de Kooning had begun to lose his memory in the late 1980s and had been suffering from Alzheimer's disease for some time. This revelation has initiated considerable debate among scholars and critics about how responsible de Kooning was for the creation of his late work.

Succumbing to the progression of his disease, de Kooning painted his final works in 1991. He died in 1997 at the age of 92 and was cremated.

Marriage to Elaine de Kooning

Elaine had admired Willem's artwork before meeting him; in 1938 her teacher introduced her to de Kooning at a Manhattan cafeteria when she was 20 and he 34. After meeting, he began to instruct her in drawing and painting. They painted in Willem's loft at 143 West 21st Street, and he was known for his harsh criticism of her work, "sternly requiring that she draw and redraw a figure or still life and insisting on fine, accurate, clear linear definition supported by precisely modulated shading." He even destroyed many of her drawings, but this "impelled Elaine to strive for both precision and grace in her work".  When they married in 1943, she moved into his loft and they continued sharing studio spaces.

Elaine and Willem de Kooning had what was later called an open marriage; they both were casual about sex and about each other's affairs. Elaine had affairs with men who helped further Willem's career, such as Harold Rosenberg, who was a renowned art critic, Thomas B. Hess, who was a writer about art and managing editor for ARTnews, and Charles Egan, owner of the Charles Egan Gallery.

Willem had a daughter, Lisa de Kooning, in 1956, as a result of his affair with Joan Ward. He also had a romance with Ruth Kligman after her affair with Jackson Pollock ended with his death in a car crash in 1956.

Elaine and Willem both struggled with alcoholism, which eventually led to their separation in 1957. While separated, Elaine remained in New York, struggling with poverty, and Willem moved to Long Island and dealt with depression. Despite bouts with alcoholism, they both continued painting. Although separated for nearly twenty years, they never divorced, and ultimately reunited in 1976.

Work

Early work

De Kooning's paintings of the 1930s and early 1940s are abstract still-lifes characterised by geometric or biomorphic shapes and strong colours. They show the influence of his friends Davis, Gorky and Graham, but also of Arp, Joan Miró, Mondrian and Pablo Picasso. In the same years de Kooning also painted a series of solitary male figures, either standing or seated, against undefined backgrounds; many of these are unfinished.

Black and white abstracts
By 1946, de Kooning had begun a series of black and white paintings, which he would continue into 1949.  During this period he had his first one-man show at the Charles Egan Gallery in 1948 consisting largely of black and white works, although a few pieces have passages of bright color.  De Kooning's black paintings are important to the history of abstract expressionism owing to their densely impacted forms, their mixed media, and their technique.

The Woman series

De Kooning painted women regularly in the early and late 1940s, but it was not until 1950 that he began to explore the female subject exclusively. His well-known Woman series, begun in 1950 and culminating in Woman VI, owes much to Picasso, not least in the aggressive, penetrative breaking apart of the figure, and the spaces around it.  Picasso's late works show signs that he, in turn, saw images of works by Pollock and de Kooning.
De Kooning led the 1950s art world  into a new movement known as American abstract expressionism. "From 1940 to the present, Woman has manifested herself in de Kooning's paintings and drawings as at once the focus of desire, frustration, inner conflict, pleasure, … and as posing problems of conception and handling as demanding as those of an engineer."  The female figure is an important symbol for de Kooning's art career and his own life. The Woman painting is considered as a significant work of art for the museum through its historical context about the post-World War II history and American feminist movement.  Additionally, the medium (oil, enamel, and charcoal on canvas) of this painting makes it different from others of de Kooning's time.

Notable works 
The painter is noted for his paintings: Woman III (1953), Woman VI (1953), Interchange (1955), and Police Gazette (1955). Some notable sculptures are Clamdigger (1972/1976) and Seated Woman on a Bench (1972/1976).

Market reception
Some of de Kooning's paintings have been sold in the 21st century for record prices. In November 2006, the American business magnate David Geffen sold his oil painting Woman III to hedge fund manager Steven A. Cohen for $137.5 million, just below the record at the time of $140 million, which involved the same people in the same month for Jackson Pollock's No. 5, 1948. A month earlier Cohen had already paid Geffen $63.5 million for Police Gazette by de Kooning. In September 2015, Geffen sold de Kooning's oil painting Interchange to hedge fund billionaire Ken Griffin for ca. $300 million, the highest price paid for a painting at the time. It held the record until November 15, 2017, when the da Vinci Salvator Mundi sold for $450 million at Christie's in New York. In November 2016, Untitled XXV sold for $66.3 million at Christie's in New York. This was a record price for a de Kooning piece sold at public auction.

According to Patricia Failing:
By the end of the 1950s, in the opinion of many, the most influential painter at work for the world was the abstract expressionist master William de Kooning. Although it was 1948 before he was given his first one man show, de Kooning had previously acquired a formidable underground reputation which served to boost him to prominence, along with Jackson Pollock, as a leading exponent of "action painting."

Solo exhibitions

The artist was featured in a number of solo exhibitions from 1948 to 1966, many in New York but also nationally and internationally. Specifically, he had fourteen separate exhibitions and even had two exhibitions per annum in the years 1953, 1964, and 1965. He was featured at the Egan Gallery, the Sidney Janis Gallery, the Museum of Fine Arts, Boston, the Arts Club of Chicago, the Martha Jackson Gallery, the Workshop Center, the Paul Kantor Gallery, the Hames Goodman Gallery, the Allan Stone Gallery, and the Smith College Museum of Art. Most of the exhibitions lasted for 3 weeks to one month. Most recent exhibition, De Kooning: Five Decades, took place in Mnuchin Gallery, New York City from April 19 till June 15, 2019.

See also
 Abstract expressionism
 Action painting
 American Figurative Expressionism
 New York Figurative Expressionism
 Elaine de Kooning
 Impasto
 Women in art
 Erased de Kooning Drawing

References

Further reading 
Marika Herskovic, American Abstract and Figurative Expressionism Style Is Timely Art Is Timeless An Illustrated Survey With Artists' Statements, Artwork and Biographies. (New York School Press, 2009). . pp. 76–79; p. 127; p. 136.
Marika Herskovic, American Abstract Expressionism of the 1950s: An Illustrated Survey, (New York School Press, 2003). . pp. 94–97.
Marika Herskovic, New York School Abstract Expressionists: Artists Choice by Artists, (New York School Press, 2000). . p. 16; p. 36; p. 106–109.
 Mark Stevens and Annalyn Swan, "de Kooning: An American Master", 2004, Knopf, Borzoi Books 
 
 Edvard Lieber, Willem de Kooning: Reflections in the Studio, 2000, Harry N. Abrams, Inc. 
ART USA NOW Ed. Lee Nordness; Vol.1, (Viking Press, 1963.) pp. 134–137.
 Richard Shiff, On "Between Sense and de Kooning", The Montréal Review, September 2011.
 Judith Zilczer, "Willem de Kooning." Phaidon Press, 2017.

External links

 Willem de Kooning Foundation
 
 Links to reproductions
 Willem de Kooning at Xavier Hufkens, Brussels
 Woman in the Pool (1969) Phoenix Art Museum
de Kooning's work in the Guggenheim Collection
 Willem de Kooning in the National Gallery of Australia's Kenneth Tyler collection
 Sam Hunter, "Willem de Kooning Lecture", The Baltimore Museum of Art: Baltimore, Maryland, 1964 Retrieved June 26, 2012
 Frank O'Hara — Rainbow Warrior
 A small-town couple left behind a stolen painting worth over $100 million — and a big mystery, Washington Post
 The American Presidency Project
Lifetime Honors – National Medal of Arts

 

Willem de Kooning
1904 births
1997 deaths
20th-century American male artists
20th-century American painters
20th-century American sculptors
20th-century Dutch male artists
Kooning, Willem de
Kooning, Willem de
Abstract expressionist artists
Abstract painters
American abstract artists
American Expressionist painters
American male painters
American male sculptors

American portrait painters
Black Mountain College faculty
Deaths from Alzheimer's disease
Deaths from dementia in New York (state)
Dutch emigrants to the United States
Kooning, Willem de
Kooning, Willem de
Kooning, Willem de
Federal Art Project artists
Fellows of the American Academy of Arts and Sciences
Honorary Members of the Royal Academy
Modern painters
Painters from New York City
Kooning, Willem De
People from East Hampton (town), New York
People from Greenwich Village
People with acquired American citizenship
Presidential Medal of Freedom recipients
Recipients of the Praemium Imperiale
Sculptors from New York (state)
United States National Medal of Arts recipients
Members of the American Academy of Arts and Letters